Volker Winkler (born 20 July 1957) is a retired East German track cyclist. He had his best achievements in the 4000 m team pursuit. In this discipline he won a silver medal at the 1980 Summer Olympics, as well as four gold medals at the world championships in 1977–1981.

After retiring from competitions in 1985 he worked as a cycling coach, first at SC Cottbus, the club he was competing for, then at RSC Cottbus, and later at Berlin Cycling Union.

References

1957 births
Living people
East German male cyclists
Olympic cyclists of East Germany
Cyclists at the 1980 Summer Olympics
Olympic medalists in cycling
Olympic silver medalists for East Germany
People from Merseburg
Cyclists from Saxony-Anhalt
Medalists at the 1980 Summer Olympics
People from Bezirk Halle